This is a list of missing people organizations grouped by international or United States location. A missing person is a person who has disappeared, and whose status as alive or dead is unknown.

International

The Missing Persons Center is the world's central reporting agency for missing persons cases, worldwide. The database consists of verifiable missing person cases that can me maintained by the families of missing people and law enforcement.  Their online missing persons community supports networking and sharing of resources, tips and press to enable researchers an updated view of all listed profiles and assists in promoting older, cold cases files.
INTERPOL is involved in missing person cases through the maintenance of an International Missing Persons Database. The database is populated by INTERPOL member countries through the use of yellow notices.  INTERPOL Notices are international requests for cooperation or alerts allowing police in member countries to share critical crime-related information. In missing person cases a Yellow Notice can be requested by any member country.  They are designed to help locate missing persons, often minors, or to help identify persons who are unable to identify themselves. Where a member country requests it, the Yellow Notice is published to the web and can be linked to the INTERPOL suite of border management tools.  This will trigger an alert in the event of anyone with a yellow notice crossing a connected border point.
The International Centre for Missing & Exploited Children works with INTERPOL, law enforcement, and elected officials worldwide to combat child pornography and abduction.
International Red Cross and Red Crescent Movement through their FamilyLinks website they help track people who are missing after a natural disaster or displaced by war to re-unite with their families.
Tie A Ribbon: Online directory raising awareness for missing people in the United Kingdom.
The International Commission on Missing Persons (ICMP), a treaty-based international organization with headquarters in The Hague, the Netherlands. Its mandate is to secure the cooperation of governments and others in locating missing persons from conflict, human rights abuses, disasters, organized crime, irregular migration and other causes and to assist them in doing so. It is the only international organization tasked exclusively to work on the issue of missing persons.
The Doe Network contains both unidentified and missing person cases for several countries throughout the world.
F3 Missing Children’s Intelligence Agency is a 501(c)(3) non-profit organization designed to find missing children. In 2021, they expanded as a US only organization to including liaison officers in Canada and Europe.

United States
The Missing Persons Center is the world's central reporting agency for missing persons cases, worldwide. The database consists of verifiable missing person cases that can me maintained by the families of missing people and law enforcement. Their online missing persons community supports networking and sharing of resources, tips and press to enable researchers an updated view of all listed profiles and assists in promoting older, cold cases files.[1]
Missing People In America Created by veterans, run by volunteers, this organization uses social media to share thousands of missing people every year.
LostNMissing Inc  is an all volunteer state and federally recognized 501(c)3 Non-Profit charitable organization to assist law enforcement and the families of missing. They never charge a fee for services and are dependent upon public donations. All Support Members, Board of Directors, Officers and Owner are Volunteers.  
National Missing and Unidentified Persons System or NamUs is a clearinghouse for missing persons and unidentified decedent records in the United States, a part of the Department of Justice.
The Doe Network contains both unidentified and missing persons cases.
Missing Persons Support Center
 St. Louis Missing Persons Inc
The Missing and Unidentified Persons Unit is part of the California Department of Justice. They help local agencies with identifying unknown, and locating missing persons.
Destiny Search Project - Is an all volunteer nonprofit based in Utah that provides services to families, law enforcement, and other groups engaged in a search for a missing person. This includes Volunteer Based Search Operations, Law Enforcement Support, Resource/Logistics Management, Public Information/Affairs, Social Media Management, and Family Support Services.
Be United Missing Persons Inc Be United is an all volunteer state and federally recognized 501(c)3 Non-Profit charitable organization to assist law enforcement and helping the families of the lost and missing. They never charge a fee for services and are dependent upon public donations. All Support Members, Officers and Founders are Volunteers. Be United Missing Persons http://www.be-united.org
The Vanished is a podcast focusing on "stories of the missing from those who knew them best." Its website has a case submission form.

References

 
Person databases